Shaoyang, formerly named Baoqing (Paoking), is a prefecture-level city in southwestern Hunan province, China, bordering Guangxi to the south. It has a history of 2500 years and remains an important commercial and transportation city in Hunan. As of the 2020 Chinese census, its total population was 6,563,520 inhabitants, of whom 1,415,173 lived in the built-up (or metro) area made of 3 urban districts and Xinshao County largely conurbated.

One of the major forest areas in Hunan, Shaoyang has a forest coverage of 42.7%. The  NanShan Pastures is one of the biggest in South Central China which provide dairy products and meat for Hunanese.

Shaoyang is home to Shaoyang University. The school is composed of former Shaoyang Normal College and Shaoyang College.

The Shaoyang dialect of Lou Shao group of dialects of Xiang is generally spoken here.

History
During the later Spring and Autumn period, official Bai Shan (白善) of Chu used to construct a city named Baigong (白公城) in Shaoyang. After the First emperor of Qin reunited China, Shaoyang was under jurisdiction of Changsha Commandery, one of thirty-six Commandery in the empire. Under the Eastern Han dynasty, Shaoyang was administered by Linling Commandery. During the Three Kingdoms era, northern part of Linling including today Shaoyang city was divided from it and designated new Zhaoling commandery (昭陵). Following Western Jin reunited Wu in 280 (or first year of Taikang era), emperor Wu changed the Commandery's name Zhaoling to Shaoling (邵陵) to avoid taboo of his father (Sima Zhao, 司马昭). Under the Southern Song period, Shao Prefecture was renamed and promoted Baoqing-fu by Lizong, whom used to take charge of Shao Prefecture defender (邵州防御使) when he was prince. The term "Baoqing" was used until 17 years of Republic of China (1928), when it was renamed Shaoyang County. After communist won Chinese Civil War, Shaoyang city was established in 1950.

Climate
Shaoyang has a monsoon-influenced, four-season humid subtropical climate (Köppen Cfa), with cool, damp winters, and hot, humid summers. Winter begins relatively dry but not sunny and becomes progressively damper and cloudier; spring brings both the most frequent and heaviest rain of the year. Summer is comparatively sunny, while autumn is somewhat dry.

Administrative divisions

Shaoyang administers three districts, two county-level cities, six counties, and one autonomous county.

Districts:
Shuangqing District
Daxiang District
Beita District

County-level City:
Wugang City
Shaodong city

Counties:
Shaoyang County
Xinshao County
Longhui County
Dongkou County
Suining County
Xinning County
Autonomous county: 
Chengbu Miao Autonomous County

Demographics
According to the Sixth National Census in 2010, Shaoyang's permanent residence population of 7,071,741 ranked it 2nd out of 14 prefecture-level divisions of Hunan; the male-female ratio was 107.95 to 100. Educational attainment levels were as follows: 4.49% bachelor's or higher, 60.01% middle school or higher, and the illiteracy rate was 3.24%. There were 1,950,605 households in which 6,913,913 resided, forming 97.77% of the provincial population and resulting in an average of 3.54 persons/household. Age distribution was as follows: 1,512,664 (21.39%) ≤14 years, 4,862,468 (68.76%) 15−64 years, 696,609 (9.85%) 65+ years.

Government

The current CPC Party Secretary of Shaoyang is Gong Congmi and the current Mayor is Liu Shiqing.

Transportation

Railway
Shaoyang has four main railway station: Shaoyang Railway Station (Fast Train, K and Highspeed train, G), Shaoyang Railway Station (Old, North, Freight),  (Fast Train, K and Highspeed train, G) and Shaoyang North railway station, in Xinshao County (Highspeed train, G and D). The  and Shanghai–Kunming high-speed railway pass through Shaoyang.

Airport

Shaoyang Wugang Airport was opened on 28 June 2017.

The airport has a 2,600-meter runway and a 3,000-square-meter terminal building. It is projected to handle 250,000 passengers and 500 tons of cargo annually by 2020.

Economy

Although it is, by 2010 Census permanent resident population, the second-largest prefecture-level division of Hunan, its GDP (4.62% of provincial output) places it ninth within the province, making it an archetypal example of a large-population, relatively backwards-economy city. The GDP per capita of 12,797 CNY is the lowest in the province, and is only 42.9% of the provincial average, 36.5% of the national average, and 78% of even Guizhou's corresponding figure. Primary, secondary, and tertiary sectors respectively accounted for 23.9%, 38.2%, and 37.9% of the economy.

Noted residents
Tsiang Tingfu, historian and diplomat
Wei Yuan, late Qing scholar
He Luting, composer
Cai E, revolutionary leader
Li Wangyang, labour rights activist whose "suicide" was allegedly staged by the local police
Zhou Shen, singer-songwriter
Tang Kai, first ever male Chinese World Champion in mixed martial arts history.
Dr George H Pearson, founder and manager of Shaoyang Hospital from 1920 to 1951 
Justin Hill, English author, whose novel, The Drink and Dream Teahouse was set in Shaoyang, and subsequently banned in China 
 Zhang Jingyi, Actress - model

Twin cities
 Saratov, Russia

References

External links

Shaoyang, China

 
Cities in Hunan
Prefecture-level divisions of Hunan